Arthrobacter russicus is a species of Gram-positive bacteria.

References

Further reading

Dodge, Anthony Gerald. Insights Into Microbial Adaptive Potential from Case Studies of Novel Functional Group Biocatalysis and Microbe-metal Interactions. ProQuest, 2008. 
Sneath, Peter HA, et al. Bergey's manual of systematic bacteriology. Volume 5. Williams & Wilkins, 1986.

External links

LPSN
Type strain of Arthrobacter russicus at BacDive -  the Bacterial Diversity Metadatabase

Micrococcaceae
Psychrophiles
Bacteria described in 2004